Jacek Broniewicz (born 18 September 1981) is a Polish footballer who plays as a defender for Polish IV liga side Polonia Głubczyce.

Career
On 9 December 2006, he played for Górny Śląsk in the game against the Polish national team.

External links
 

1981 births
Living people
Association football defenders
Polish footballers
Polonia Bytom players
Polonia Warsaw players
Podbeskidzie Bielsko-Biała players
Place of birth missing (living people)
Ekstraklasa players
I liga players
II liga players
III liga players
IV liga players